M. Obaidul Huq is a Bangladesh Awami League politician and the former Member of Parliament of Chittagong-3.

Career
Huq was elected to parliament from Chittagong-3 as a Bangladesh Awami League candidate in 1973.

References

Awami League politicians
2012 deaths
1st Jatiya Sangsad members
Year of birth missing
People from Sandwip Upazila